Paszowice  is a village in Jawor County, Lower Silesian Voivodeship, in south-western Poland. It is the seat of the administrative district (gmina) called Gmina Paszowice. Prior to 1945 it was in Germany.

Gallery

References

Paszowice